is a multi-purpose stadium in Kobe Sports Park, located in Suma-ku, Kobe, Japan.  It is currently used mostly for soccer matches.  The stadium holds 36,000 people.  It was built in 1985 for the 1985 Summer Universiade. It hosted the 2006 61st National Sports Festival of Japan main stadium. Local football club Vissel Kobe play some high attendance matches at the stadium.

Japan national football team played some of their home matches here, including a 3-0 win over Hong Kong in a World Cup qualifier in August 1985.

On May 9, 2007 the Japan national rugby union team played the Classic All Blacks here. The result was a win for the latter, 36–25. Other rugby games, including Top League games are sometimes played at the stadium.

Reference

External links 

 

Football venues in Japan
Buildings and structures in Kobe
Athletics (track and field) venues in Japan
Rugby union stadiums in Japan
Vissel Kobe
Multi-purpose stadiums in Japan
Sports venues in Hyōgo Prefecture
Tourist attractions in Kobe
Sport in Kobe
Sports venues completed in 1978
1978 establishments in Japan
1985 Summer Universiade